Sundarbasti is a village in Nepal which is situated in Chitwan District of Bagmati Province. It is in 14th ward of Bharatpur. It is famous for gaucharan as a football ground where wardleague is held in occasion of dashain, a festival of Hinduism. The primary occupation in the village is agriculture. It is connected with Bharatpur by Madithori highway. Sangam hatchery is situated in here.  Sunderbasti siturated one basic school sundarbasti.

Origin
Sundar mean beautiful and basti mean village.

See also
 chitwan

References 

Villages in Chitwan District